Asenath Bole Odaga (1937–2014) was a Kenyan publisher and author of novels, plays, children's books, and other literary works.  Odaga also promoted literature in Kenyan languages and the study of oral literature by writing in Luo and co-authoring a guide to oral literature for students.

Biography
Born in Rarieda, Kenya in 1938, Asenath Bole Odaga was educated at Alliance Girls High School and University of Nairobi. At University of Nairobi Odaga submitted a thesis for the Masters of Arts degree: Educational Values of "Sigendeni Luo": The Kenya Luo Oral Narratives.

In 1982 Odaga founded Lake Publishers and became the first female publisher in Kenya. She would later open the Thu-Thinda bookstore in Kisumu. Odaga founded the Kenya Women Literature Group in 1986, with the intention of developing works in Kenyan languages by and for women.  

Odaga also wrote books for children, saying "I thought that children should have something to read about their own background and the other children they know, real African heroes with whom they can identify" These stories often focus on the daily life of children.  

Asenath Bole Odaga died on December 1, 2014.

Legacy
Odaga was listed by the Daily Nation as one of the writers having the most impact on Kenyan society. Her work has been cited as an influence on Kenyan novelist Yvonne Adhiambo Owuor.

Published works
English—Dholuo Dictionary
The Villager's Son (1971)
Thu tinda : stories from Kenya (1980)
Yesterday's today : a study of oral literature (1984)
Ogilo nungo piny kirom (1983)
The Shade Changes (1984)
Nyamgondho wuod ombare gi sigendini luo moko (1985)
The storm (1985)
Literature for children and young people in Kenya (1985)
Munde goes to the market (1987), with Adrienne Moore
A bridge in time (1987)
Munde and his friends (1987)
Between the years (1987)
Jande's ambition (1988)
The silver cup (1988)
The hare's blanket. And other stories (1989), with Adrienne Moore
Poko nyar migumba : gi sigend luo mamoko (1989), with
The diamond ring (1989)
The angry flames (1989), with Adrienne Moore
The secret of the monkey rock (1989)
Riana (1991)
A night on a tree (1991)
My home (1991)
The love ash, rosa and other stories (1992)
Simbi nyaima (1993)
Basic English-Luo words and phrases (1993)
Why the hyena has a crooked neck and other stories (1993)
Endless road (1995)
Luo sayings (1995)
Something for nothing (2001)
Mogen jabare (2003)
Nyangi gi Otis (2004)
The Luo oral literature and educational values of its narratives (2010)

References

External links
 "Asenath Odaga: Matriarch who bequeathed us rich literature and sense of belonging", in sde.co.ke
 "Asenath Odaga passes on in Kisumu" in Kisumuinfo.com 
 "Kenyan literary icon Asenath Bole Odaga dies in Kisumu" by David Ohito, in Standard Media.co.ke

Kenyan women writers
Kenyan novelists
Kenyan children's writers
Kenyan women children's writers
Kenyan women novelists
1937 births
2014 deaths
People from Siaya County
University of Nairobi alumni
20th-century Kenyan businesswomen
20th-century Kenyan businesspeople
Alumni of Alliance Girls High School